Hierarchical epistemology is a theory of knowledge which posits that beings have different access to reality depending on their ontological rank.

References

Epistemological theories